Jonas Okétola (born August 27, 1983, in Nigeria) is a retired Nigerian-Beninese former footballer. He last played for Thanda Royal Zulu.

Career
Born in Nigeria, Okétola played professional football for local side Kwara United F.C. before signing with South African club Thanda Royal Zulu in 2008.

The South Africa Soccer Association assessed a two-year ban on Okétola in January 2009, as a result of a doping violation. A random test after a league match turned up a positive result for amphetamines, a prohibited substance.

International career
He was part of the Beninese 2004 African Nations Cup team, who finished bottom of their group in the first round of competition, thus failing to qualify for the quarter-finals.

External links

References

1983 births
Living people
Nigerian people of Beninese descent
Citizens of Benin through descent
Beninese footballers
Benin international footballers
2004 African Cup of Nations players
2008 Africa Cup of Nations players
Association football midfielders
AS Dragons FC de l'Ouémé players
Enyimba F.C. players
Kwara United F.C. players
Thanda Royal Zulu F.C. players
USS Kraké players
People from Benin City
Doping cases in association football
Beninese sportspeople in doping cases
Beninese expatriate footballers
Expatriate soccer players in South Africa
Beninese expatriate sportspeople in South Africa
Expatriate footballers in Northern Cyprus
Beninese expatriate sportspeople in Northern Cyprus